Royal Association Athlétique Louviéroise La Louvière, abbreviated to RAAL La Louvière, is a Belgian association football club located in La Louvière, in the province of Hainaut. The club, founded in 2009 out of a merger, plays in the Belgian National Division 1, the third tier of Belgian football.

History

Early history
Cercle Sportif Couillet was founded in 1919 and joined the Royal Belgian Football Association (KBVB) in 1920. In 1934 the club had risen to the national divisions for the first time. After that, the club spent the next decades in the lower-tier Belgian Provincial Leagues.

In 1945 the club officially changed its name to Amicale Cercle Sportif Couillet. A few years later, in 1949, another club was founded in Couillet, Union Sportive Couillet d'Amérique. After a few years in a competing amateur association, they moved to the KBVB in 1952 as a debuting club, under matricule number 5580. In 1956, they effectively became member.

In 1962, Amicale Cercle Sportif Couillet received the royal title and changed its name to Royale Amicale Cercle Sportif Couillet (RACS Couillet). In 1977, both clubs from Couillet eventually merged. The new club was named Royale Association Cercle Sportif Couillet (also abbreviated as RACS Couillet), and continued to play under matricule number 94 of Amicale Cercle Sportif.

At the beginning of the 2000s, the club successfully worked its way up from the Belgian Provincial Leagues. After all, in 2000 RACS Couillet had climbed back up to the national Belgian Fourth Division and in 2005 they even forced promotion to the Belgian Third Division. However, in the 2007–08 season, the club finished last in the table and relegated back to the Fourth Division.

Football Couillet-La Louvière (2009–2011)

In 2009, it was decided to collaborate with third-division team RAA Louviéroise, a former top-tier team were was experiencing financial difficulties. It did not come to an official merger, but the name RAA Louviéroise was dropped and the club name of RACS Couillet was changed to Football Couillet-La Louvière, which continued to play in the Fourth Division with Couillet's matricule number 94, with the traditional matricle number of RAA Louviéroise, number 93, being lost. The first team played in the stadium of RAA Louviéroise, the Stade du Tivoli in La Louvière. Several youth teams continued to play in the Stade du Fiestaux and other areas in Couillet. In the club logo, the wolf was taken from the RAA Louviéroise logo, and the club's nickname became "Les Loups" ("the wolves"). The green and white club colors were retained.

FC Charleroi (2011–2014)

In the spring of 2011, the football landscape in La Louvière and Charleroi changed again. Football club URS du Center, affiliated with the Royal Belgian Football Association (KBVB) with matricle number 213, started playing in the Stade du Tivoli under the new name UR La Louvière Centre. The recently relocated Football Couillet-La Louvière returned to Charleroi and the name became Football Club Charleroi (FC Charleroi). There was also cooperation with provincial club RFCS Marcinelle, affiliated with the KBVB with matricule number 301, although this did not immediately lead to a merger. In the course of the 2011–12 season, the club's identity was changed further. Blue and white colors were chosen and a logo with a lion was introduced.

In 2013, the board took over football club RJS Heppignies-Lambusart-Fleurus, who were experiencing financial difficulties. This club was affiliated with the KBVB through matricule number 5192 and competed in the Belgian Third Division. The first team of FC Charleroi was transferred to that club from next season, which was renamed Charleroi Fleurus. They started playing in the Third Division in Charleroi and the club colors and the logo of FC Charleroi were also adopted. Under the matricule number 94, an "empty" club would remain and the matricule number was "for sale". Because chairman Roberto Leone had not yet found a suitable investor, a team for the Belgian Fourth Division and a youth team were registered for the 2013–14 season. On the second matchday, the club suffered a staggering 12–0 loss to Sint-Eloois-Winkel Sport. FC Charleroi ended the season in the Belgian Fourth Division with a 16–0 loss against OMS Ingelmunster. They finished the season with only five points and conceded 144 goals. FC Charleroi thus relegated to the Belgian Provincial Leagues.

Racing Charleroi-Couillet-Fleurus (2014–2017)

After the season there was a major change of matricule numbers between a number of Walloon clubs. The Liège Provincial League club RFC Sérésien (matricule number 23) was acquired by the French Ligue 2 club FC Metz. They wanted to enter the Belgian Second Division as soon as possible, and because this would take at least three seasons via the sporting route, they were looking for a matricule number to take a shortcut to the higher divisions. They found this in Hainaut Province at Second Division club Boussu Dour Borinage (matricule number 167), who were having financial difficulties. Boussu Dour wanted to leave their matricule number on the condition that they could take over another matricule number in the national series and keep their national youth license. Boussu Dour found an agreement with Roberto Leone, president of relegating fourth division FC Charleroi (matricule number 94) and relegating Third Division team Charleroi-Fleurus (matricule number 5192, and in possession of a national youth license). Boussu Dour would take over the matricule number 5192 and continue playing as Francs Borains in the Fourth Division. Matricule number 167 was taken over by Seraing United.

Due to the departure of matricule number 5192, they fell back to the remaining matricule number 94 to develop a club in the region around Charleroi. Administratively, a merger was entered into with the redundant matricule number 23 of RFC Sérésien, which thus brought its national license for youth work into the merger. The fusion club was called RC Charleroi-Couillet-Fleurus (RCCF) and continued to play with matricule number 94. Due to the relegation of FC Charleroi, RCCF started in 2014–15 in the Provincial League of Hainaut.

After one season, the club played in Belgian Fourth Division again and was able to force promotion to the Third Division via the final round, which then became Belgian Second Amateur Division for the 2016–17 season. The club, however, only outdid UR Namur in the league table, and relegated after one season.

RAAL La Louvière (2017–present)
Meanwhile, after the disintegration of the historic RAA La Louvière into lower tier clubs in Charleroi, URS Center became La Louvière's primary club and took the name UR La Louvière Centre. Yet, not everyone thought that this club was really the replacement for RAAL. Under the initiative of former footballer Salvatore Curaba, the matricule number of Racing Charleroi Couillet Fleurus was taken over and the name was changed to RAAL La Louvière, with the club returning to the city of La Louvière. In the 2017–18 season, the club started competing in the fifth-tier Belgian Third Amateur Division, where the club immediately won the title in its inaugural season.

Current squad
As of 4 February, 2023.

References

External links 
  

RAAL La Louvière
Association football clubs established in 1919
1919 establishments in Belgium
Sport in La Louvière
Sport in Charleroi
Sports team relocations